Amaranthus californicus is a species of flowering plant in the amaranth family known as California amaranth. It is a glabrous monoecious annual that is native to most of the western United States and Canada. It is found in moist flats or near bodies of water, and it blooms from summer to fall.

References

External links
Photo gallery

californicus
Flora of Washington (state)
Plants described in 1880
Taxa named by Sereno Watson